Auximobasis tarachodes is a moth in the  family Blastobasidae. It was described by Walsingham in 1912. It is found in Central America.

References

Natural History Museum Lepidoptera generic names catalog

Blastobasidae
Moths described in 1912